Sam or Samuel Cabot may refer to:

Writers (collective nom de plume: Sam Cabot)
 Carlos Dews (born 1963)
 S. J. Rozan (born 1950)

Cabot family
Samuel Cabot III, physician and ornithologist 
Samuel Cabot Incorporated, manufacturer of wood stain and other wood products
Samuel Cabot Jr. of Cabot family
Samuel Cabot IV, founder of Samuel Cabot Incorporated

Others
Sam Cabot, fictional character in 4th of July (novel)

Human name disambiguation pages